Æthelric (also: Aethelric or Ethelric) is a masculine Anglo-Saxon name that may refer to:

 Æthelric (bishop of Dorchester) (died 1034), Bishop of Dorcester
 Æthelric (bishop of Durham) (fl. 1042–1072), Bishop of Durham, once thought to have been an archbishop of York
 Æthelric (bishop of Sherborne) (fl. c. 1001–c. 1011), Bishop of Sherborne
 Æthelric of Bernicia (fl. 568–572), King of Bernicia
 Æthelric of Deira (fl. c. 589/599–c. 604), King of Deira 
 Æthelric of Hwicce (fl. 692–736), King of Hwicce 
 Æthelric son of Æthelmund (fl. 804–after 804), Ealdorman of Hwicce
 Æthelric I (fl. c. 1032–1038), Bishop of Selsey 
 Æthelric II (fl. c. 1058–c. 1076), Bishop of Selsey

Old English given names
Masculine given names